Artificial Sons (Spanish: Los hijos artificiales) is a 1943 Argentine comedy film directed by Antonio Momplet. It was based on a play of the same name that was later turned into the 1953 Mexican film The Great Deceiver.

The film's art direction was by Ralph Pappier.

Cast
 Joaquín Abati
 Olimpio Bobbio 
 Adrián Cuneo 
 Isabel Figlioli 
 Felisa Mary 
 Sara Olmos 
 Raimundo Pastore 
 Iris Portillo 
 Pedro Quartucci 
 María Santos 
 Alberto Terrones 
 Malisa Zini 
 Marcos Zucker 
 Francisco Álvarez

References

Bibliography 
 Alfred Charles Richard. Censorship and Hollywood's Hispanic image: an interpretive filmography, 1936-1955. Greenwood Press, 1993.

External links 
 

1943 films
Argentine comedy films
1943 comedy films
1940s Spanish-language films
Films directed by Antonio Momplet
Argentine black-and-white films
1940s Argentine films